The Daurian Nature Reserve (Даурский заповедник Daurskiy zapavyednik) is a Russian 'zapovednik' (strict nature reserve) situated in the southern part of the Zabaykalsky Krai in Siberia, Russia, close to the border with Mongolia. It is part of a World Heritage Site named "The Landscapes of Dauria".

The reserve has been established in 1987 to protect the dry steppes and wetlands of South Siberia. It is contiguous with the Dornod Mongol Biosphere Reserve in Mongolia, a  area of steppe immediately to the south.

The reserve comprises 222,965.00 ha, of which about 173,201.00 ha constitute the buffer zone. The core area is of about 49,764.00 ha and is divided into 9 plots. The buffer zone of the reserve covers the Torey Lakes, two large lakes called Barun-Torey and Zun-Torey.

Ecoregion and climate
The Daurian Reserve is located in the Daurian forest steppe ecoregion, a band of grassland, shrub terrain, and mixed forests in northeast Mongolia and a portion of Siberia, Russia.

The climate at the Daurian Reserve is Subarctic climate, dry winter (Köppen climate classification Subarctic climate(Dwc)). This climate is characterized by mild summers (only 1-3 months above ) and cold winters having monthly precipitation less than one-tenth of the wettest summer month.

Flora and fauna
The vertebrate fauna includes 48 mammal species, 317 bird species, 3 reptile species, 3 amphibian species and 4 species of fish. In addition, there are about 800 species of insects. The reserve also contains 1 colony of the rare Iris potaninii. It had been planned to introduce the Przewalski horse to the reserve in the 1980s, but the plans were cancelled following the collapse of the Soviet Union, although hopes for their implementation were rekindled in 2009. Mammals of the reserve included on the IUCN red list are dzeren, pallas cat and Daurian hedgehog.Recently a new zakaznik, the Dzeren Valley (Долина дзерена Dalina dzyeryena), has been created in the area to ensure migration of the dzeren between Russia and Mongolia.

References

External links
 Daursky Nature Reserve at www.rusnature.info
 Daursky Nature Reserve at mapcarta.com
 Whitleyaward - Vadim Kirilyuk: Research and Conservation of migrating Mongolian Gazelles across Russian-Mongolian Border, Russia
 Daursky Nature Reserve at official site daurzapoved.com

Nature reserves in Russia
Geography of Zabaykalsky Krai
World Heritage Sites in Russia
Tourist attractions in Zabaykalsky Krai
Zapovednik